MoEDAL (Monopole and Exotics Detector at the LHC) is a particle physics experiment at the Large Hadron Collider (LHC).

Experiment
MoEDAL shares the cavern at Point 8 with LHCb, and its prime goal is to directly search for the magnetic monopole (MM) or dyon and other highly ionizing stable massive particles (SMPs) and pseudo-stable massive particles via the Schwinger effect. To detect these particles, the project uses nuclear track detectors (NTDs), which suffer characteristic damage due to highly ionizing particles. As MMs and SMPs are highly ionizing, NTDs are perfectly suited for the purpose of detection.

It is an international research collaboration whose spokesperson is the University of Alberta's James Pinfold. It is the seventh experiment at the LHC, was approved and sanctioned by the CERN research board in May 2010, and started its first test deployment in January 2011.

In 2012 MoEDAL accuracy surpassed accuracy of similar experiments. A new detector was installed in 2015, but as of 2017 it also did not find any magnetic monopoles, setting new limits on their production cross section.

References

External links
 http://moedal.web.cern.ch/
 MoEDAL experiment record on INSPIRE-HEP

CERN experiments
Particle experiments
Large Hadron Collider